Barbie and the Rockers (or Barbie and the Rock Stars in Europe) was a doll line made in the mid-1980s by Mattel to compete with Hasbro's popular Jem doll line. They were on the market for roughly 3 years and there was a direct-to-video film made to go with the line titled Barbie and the Rockers: Out of This World. This was followed by a sequel called Barbie and the Sensations: Rockin' Back to Earth. The line was brought back in late 2017 as a Target exclusive. The characters include Diva (a Scottish-Irish-American redhead), Dana (a Korean-American) and Dee-Dee (an African-American).

Home media 
Beginning in 1987, select episodes were released in the United States on Hi-Tops Video NTSC VHS tapes by Hi-Tops Video's Hi-Tops Video Mini Features line. Beginning in 1987, 1989, 1992 and 1994, select episodes were released in the United Kingdom on 30-minute, PAL VHS tapes by Channel 5, Mia Video, rated  U  for "Universal" and deemed suitable for all ages.  The series was distributed by Saban Productions, which was owned by Mattel, the makers of the "Barbie" dolls. As a result, Mattel must give approval before any future home video release of the series is made available.

In the UK, the series was released on VHS by Channel 5 and Mia Video in 1987, 1988, 1989, 1992 and 1994.

References

External links
 Rock Jem: Similar Dolls – Dolls and cartoon information.

Rockers, Barbie and the
1980s toys